Wisconsin's Old Executive Residence, known better as the Old Governor's Mansion, is located at 130 East Gilman Street in the Mansion Hill Historic District of Madison, Wisconsin, on the southern shore of Lake Mendota. Constructed of local sandstone sometime around 1854–1856, it served as the official residence of the governor of Wisconsin from 1885 to 1950. It was added to the National Register of Historic Places in 1973. Since August 2019 it has been open as a boutique hotel named Governor's Mansion Inn.

History
According to the Madison Landmarks Commission, "this house was originally built for Catherine and Julius T. White, Secretary of the Wisconsin Insurance Company. The Whites sold the house in 1857 to one of Madison's first settlers, George P. Delaplaine, and his wife Emily. Delaplaine was secretary to Governors Farwell and Dewey and co-owner of one of the largest real estate development firms in the city. In 1867 the house rose to greater social prominence when it was purchased by State Senator J. G. Thorp, a millionaire lumber baron, and his wife Amelia. In 1870, the Thorps' young daughter, Sara, married Ole Bull, the world-famous 60-year-old Norwegian violinist in one of the most lavish weddings the town had ever seen."

In 1883, the mansion was purchased privately by Governor and future U.S. Secretary of Agriculture Jeremiah McLain Rusk for $15,000. Two years later, he sold it to the state and it became the official residence of the Governor. Over the years, 18 governors resided here. It remained the official residence until 1949/50, when the current Wisconsin Governor's Mansion in the village of Maple Bluff was purchased by the state. State Assemblywoman Ruth Doyle and others opposed the move out of concern about the future of the Old Executive Residence.

In 1951, the building was repurposed as a residential unit for the University of Wisconsin–Madison. Renamed Knapp House in honor of Kemper K. Knapp, it housed graduate students for more than 50 years. In 2016, it was sold as state surplus property to Bob Klebba and David Waugh, who renovated and redeveloped it as a boutique hotel.

References

External links
 Governor's Mansion Inn

Government buildings on the National Register of Historic Places in Wisconsin
Former governors' mansions in the United States
Houses in Madison, Wisconsin
National Register of Historic Places in Madison, Wisconsin
Hotel buildings on the National Register of Historic Places in Wisconsin
Governor of Wisconsin